, is a Japanese owarai comedy duo of  as boke and  as tsukkomi, formed in 2000. The duo won 2nd place in the M-1 Grand Prix 2008 competition. As of February 2009, the duo belongs to the management company K Dash Stage Co., Ltd.

Biography 
When Wakabayashi tried to explain to Kasuga what he had been told, Kasuga "thought he was just joking." Rejecting the idea but swapping their roles instead, they finally started to make first appearances on terrestrial TV broadcasts in 2008. On December 21, 2008, the two made it all the way to the final round of the M-1 Grand Prix of the year from the consolation. After the first session of the final, competed and broadcast live on the same day, they were temporarily in the top position ahead of the other eight duos, but ended up 2nd overall behind NON STYLE.

The manzai performed by Audrey is characterized by Kasuga's trying to shoot tsukkomi but each time turning out to be terribly off-the-line boke, interrupting Wakabayashi's talks with delayed responses and frequent gags. Wakabayashi, on the other hand, either reacts fast and hard with his tsukkomi in return, or sometimes just "ignores" him.

In 2009, they were on TV commercials for major global companies such as Toyota Motor, Nintendo and KFC.

Little Toos 
On the May 19, 2012 broadcast of All Night Nippon, Wakabayashi decided to call their regular listeners , combining Lady Gaga's fandom name "Little Monsters" and Kasuga's catchphrase, "Toos!" Since then, several Japanese entertainers have proclaimed themselves Little Tooses, such as Hokuto Matsumura, Yugo Kochi, Meru Nukumi, Hikaru Takahashi, and Konoka Matsuda.

Members 
 
 Date of Birth: February 9, 1979
 175 cm  88 kg  B101  W83  H98  F28.5 cm
 Birthplace: Tokorozawa, Saitama
 Manzai Role: Boke

 
 Date of Birth: September 20, 1978
 168 cm  60 kg  B87  W75  H80  F26.5 cm
 Birthplace: Chūō, Tokyo
 Manzai Role: Tsukkomi
 Writes the material for the unit

Media

TV 
Regular
 (ヒルナンデス!) -- Nippon Television (10/5/2011-) *Every Wednesday
 (いきなり! 黄金伝説。) -- TV Asahi (4/15/2010-) *Every Thursday
 (キャンパスナイト･フジ) -- Fuji Television/CX (4/10/2009-)
 (スクール革命!) -- Nippon Television (4/5/2009-)
 (メレンゲの気持ち) -- Nippon Television (4/25/2009-) *Every three weeks
 (ぜんぶウソ) -- Nippon Television (10/3/2009-)
 (森田一義アワー笑っていいとも！) -- Fuji Television (10/9/2009-9/26/2011) *Every Friday
 (オードリーさん、ぜひ会ってほしい人がいるんです。) -- Chūkyō Television Broadcasting (4/8/2012-)
 (AKB_チーム8のブンブン!エイト大放送) -- Nippon Television (1/28/2017-4/1/2017)
Hiragana Oshi (ひらがな推し) →Hinatazaka de Aimashō（日向坂で会いましょう）-- TV Tokyo (08/4/2018-)

Irregular
 (快盗!!シノビーナ) -- TV Asahi (1/17/2009-)
 (クイズプレゼンバラエティー Qさま!!}) -- TV Asahi

Radio 
 (オードリーのシャンプーおじさん) -- Nippon Cultural Broadcasting (4/7/2009-) *Every Tuesday
All Night Nippon (オールナイトニッポン) -- Nippon Broadcasting System (10/10/2009-) *Every Sunday from 1:00 am

Internet TV 
Regular
Sora o Minakya Komaruyo! (そらを見なきゃ困るよ!)—GyaO Jocky (11/2007-）
Kokuccha! (告っちゃ!)—GyaO Jocky (5/2007-）
Ainari (あいなり)—GyaO Jocky (9/2007-10/2007）
After School, Totsugeki High School (After School TV内「突撃!ハイスクール」)—Nikkei Shingaku Navi (3/2008-）

Magazines
Tokyo Isshukan
TV Pia

CM
Nintendo "Nintendo DSi" (2/14/2009-）
Kaunet (3/2/2009 - ）
Kentucky Fried Chicken (3/5/2009-)
Sapporo Brewery "Draft One" (7/2009-)
DHC "Men's Drug Wax"(9/19/2009-)
Toyota Motor "Ractis" (10/2009-)
Benesse Corporation "Shinken Zemi Chugaku koza" (11/2009-)
Ajinomoto "No Mikata" (11/2009-)

See also 
 Owarai
 Manzai

Notes

References
 The Asahi Shimbun, January 25, 2009

External links 
 K Dash Stage profile
 Owarai TV - Audrey

Japanese comedy duos
Living people
Year of birth missing (living people)